Myrna Williams may refer to:

Myrna Adele Williams (1905–1993), American movie star Myrna Loy's birth name
Myrna Williams (politician) (born 1929), American politician